Steve Blum (born 1960) is an American voice actor.

Steven Blum may also refer to:
 H Steven Blum (born 1946), U.S. Army general
 Steven G. Blum, American attorney and educator
 Stephen Blum (born 1942), American educator and ethnomusicologist 
 Stephen Blum, founder of PubNub